The Battle of Mount Tifata was fought in 83 BC as part of Sulla's Second Civil War.

History 
It was fought in the foothills of Mount Tifata, a spur of the Apennines, close to the River Vulturnus, and is alternatively known as the Battle of Casilinum. The location of the battle suggests that Sulla was moving on Capua. The Optimate forces were led by Lucius Cornelius Sulla and his officer Quintus Caecilius Metellus, while the Populares were led by Gaius Norbanus. The battle started when Sulla “immediately attacked” Norbanus, even though Velleius claims Norbanus attacked Sulla. As an army under Scipio was currently moving to support Norbanus it is likely that Sulla attacked Norbanus by surprise before he could link up with Scipio. In total Scipio's and Norbanus’ armies numbered 100,000 as compared to at most 40,000 under Sulla. Sulla was victorious. Afterwards Sulla besieged Norbanus in Capua.

References

83 BC
Mount Tifata 83 BC
Mount Tifata
Mount Tifata